Lisa Heddens (born June 6, 1964) is an American politician who served as a member of the Iowa House of Representatives from 2003 to 2019.

Early life and education 
Heddens was born in Rochester, Minnesota. She received her Bachelor of Science degree and a teaching certificate from Iowa State University.

Career 
Heddens served as ranking member on the House Health and Human Services Appropriations subcommittee. She was also assistant minority leader in the House. Heddens was re-elected in 2006 with 8,371 votes (63%), defeating Republican John Griswold and Libertarian Eric Cooper.

Personal life
Heddens's husband, Jeff, works for the Iowa Department of Public Defense. They have two children.

References

External links
 Representative Lisa Heddens official Iowa General Assembly site
 Lisa Heddens State Representative official constituency site
 
 Financial information (state office) at the National Institute for Money in State Politics

Democratic Party members of the Iowa House of Representatives
Living people
Women state legislators in Iowa
1964 births
Iowa State University alumni
Politicians from Rochester, Minnesota
Politicians from Ames, Iowa
21st-century American politicians
21st-century American women politicians